Toddville is a small unincorporated community in Horry County, South Carolina, United States. Toddville is south of Conway on U.S. Route 701 and mostly consists of farmland.

The local timezone is named America / New York with an UTC offset of -4 hours.

References

Unincorporated communities in South Carolina
Unincorporated communities in Horry County, South Carolina